Huskinson is a surname. Notable people with the surname include:

Geoffrey Huskinson (cricketer) (1900–1982), English cricketer
Geoffrey Huskinson (cartoonist) (1935–2018), English cartoonist and cricketer
Henry Huskinson (1890–1963), British gymnast
Patrick Huskinson (1897–1966), British Royal Air Force officer